Moreiradromia is a genus of sponge crabs in the family Dromiidae.

Species
Species within this genus include:
 Moreiradromia antillensis (Stimpson, 1858)
 Moreiradromia sarraburei (Rathbun, 1910)

References

Dromiacea